The 1987 Georgia Tech Yellow Jackets football team represented the Georgia Institute of Technology during the 1987 NCAA Division I-A football season. The Yellow Jackets were led by first-year head coach Bobby Ross, and played their home games at Grant Field in Atlanta, the last season under that name before the stadium was renamed in honor of legendary Georgia Tech head coach Bobby Dodd. The team competed as members of the Atlantic Coast Conference, finishing in last and failing to a win a conference game.

Schedule

Sources:

References

Georgia Tech
Georgia Tech Yellow Jackets football seasons
Georgia Tech Yellow Jackets football